The Iberian Supercup (Spanish: Supercopa Ibérica, Portuguese: Supertaça Ibérica) is an annual men's cup competition for Spanish and Portugese handball teams. It was first held in 2022. The participating teams are the 1st and 2nd placed teams from previous season of Liga ASOBAL and Andebol 1. It's played in 4 matches taking place during one weekend.

Supercopa Ibérica replaced the previous Supercopa ASOBAL in Spain.

Previous

Titles by team

References

Handball cup competitions in Spain
Recurring sporting events established in 2022